Lai People's Party, a political party in the Indian state of Mizoram. LPP is active in the Chhimutuipui East district. LPP holds one (of 27) seat in the Lai Autonomous District Council.

Political parties in Mizoram
Year of establishment missing